Dobré ráno, Brno! (Good Morning, Brno!) is a comedy television series directed by Jan Prušinovský, who also co-wrote the screenplay with Tomáš Holeček. Prušinovský was inspired by Czech TV show Dobré ráno. The series he exaggerates and parodies Dobré ráno, its crew and the behind-the-scenes situations. Prušinovský wrote the script for the series based on his own experience when he himself was a guest on the Dobré ráno broadcast in the Brno studio. The series starrs Jan Kolařík, Zuzana Zlatohlávková, Ondřej Kokorský, Simona Lewandowská, Roman Slovák, Tereza Volánková, Ivana Hloužková and Nikola Mucha.

The series was first shown in September 2022 at the Serial Killer festival in Brno. The first part of the series had its television premiere on ČT1 on 9 January 2023 but Czech Television published it ahead of time on iVysílání on 31 December 2022. On 5 March 2023 Prušinovský announced that series was renewed for second season that would start filming in April 2023. The first season had average rating 554,000 viewers including online views (20.12% share).

Cast
Jan Kolařík as director Mirek Kurš
Zuzana Zlatohlávková as moderator Radka Vrbíková
Ondřej Kokorský as moderator Cyril Lomný
Simona Lewandowská as weather moderator Andrea Baďurová
Ivana Hloužková as costume designer Dáda Kopáčová
Nikola Mucha as costume designer Pája
Tereza Volánková as assistant director Alžběta
Slávek Bílský as cook Slávek
Roman Slovák as homeless Luboš
Roman Nevěčný as Horst
Vladimír Hauser as Mára
Josef Hron as taxi driver
Pavel Čeněk Vaculík as Miki
Mark Kristián Hochman as Luki
Beáta Hrnčiříková as producer Johana
Vojtěch Hrabák as dramaturg Vít Šmarda
Jan Jankovský as Hynek, Radka's husband

Episodes

External links
Website (in Czech)
IMDb.com

References 

Czech comedy television series
2023 Czech television series debuts
Czech Television original programming